Amylo-alpha-1,6-glucosidase (amylo-1,6-glucosidase, dextrin 6-alpha-D-glucosidase, amylopectin 1,6-glucosidase, dextrin-1,6-glucosidase, glycogen phosphorylase-limit dextrin alpha-1,6-glucohydrolase) is an enzyme with systematic name glycogen phosphorylase-limit dextrin 6-alpha-glucohydrolase. This enzyme catalyses the following chemical reaction

 Hydrolysis of (1->6)-alpha-D-glucosidic branch linkages in glycogen

This enzyme hydrolyses an unsubstituted (1->4)-linked glucose chain.

References

External links 

EC catalog entry

EC 3.2.1